Vétraz-Monthoux is a commune in the Haute-Savoie department in the Auvergne-Rhône-Alpes region in south-eastern France.

It is in the northern part of Haute-Savoie and right next to the Swiss border.

The poet Jean-Vincent Verdonnet (1923–2013) died in Vétraz-Monthoux.

Population

See also
Communes of the Haute-Savoie department

References

External links 

 Vétraz-Monthoux web page"

Communes of Haute-Savoie